Russell "Russ" Williams (born 21 January 1962) is an English radio DJ from Blackpool, primarily known for his long-running shows on Virgin Radio (from 1993), and 2008 to 2016 on Absolute Radio, the re-launched version of Virgin Radio.

Early life
Williams trained at London's National Broadcasting School in Programming and Journalism.

Radio career
After his training, Williams landed a journalist job at Brighton's Southern Sound including presenting weekend Breakfast, which then led to a presenting job at Radio Mercury in Sussex, presenting a chart show every Sunday from 3–5pm. Williams then moved to Finland where he presented his own show on Helsinki's Radio 1. 

Williams returned to the UK and joined Newcastle's Metro Radio. In 1990, he joined London's Capital Radio to present the Weekend Breakfast Show, which remained his domain for three years. He often stood in as holiday relief for Chris Tarrant, and he also hosted The Rebel Yell Rock Machine, which was syndicated across the nation's airwaves every week.

Williams worked at Virgin Radio since it went on air in 1993. His first role was the Breakfast show, initially on his own, then alongside Jonathan Coleman. In October 1997, due to Chris Evans' arrival at the station, the duo went on to present the Drivetime show and in early 1998, Williams took on the mid-morning show on his own, until he finished in May 2015. He also presented a show on Absolute Classic Rock but left both shows in May 2015. In February 2008, he joined TalkSport as host of Kick Off. 

Williams announced that he was leaving his mid-morning show on Absolute Radio on 28 April 2015 but would still continue his Saturday afternoon show for Rock and Roll Football. His last appearance on Rock and Roll Football was in May 2016. He joined Global Radio to host breakfast on Smooth Radio in March 2016 and began presenting on LBC London News later that year with his Saturday afternoon football show, Scores. He left both suddenly in 2018.

He has hosted Saturday Scoreboard for Talksport after leaving Global.

On 14 January 2019, he and Jonathan Coleman were reunited and joined Fix Radio when they started hosting their new show called The Russ & Jono Fix Radio Experience.

In January 2020, Williams began hosting the weekday morning show 10–1pm on London’s DAB station, Nation Radio UK.

As of 11 April 2022, Williams began hosting the weekday afternoon show 1pm - 4pm on Nation Radio UK's sister stations Nation Radio Scotland and Nation Radio Wales in addition to his Nation Radio UK show.

TV work

In 1995 and 1996, Williams was host of the Sky Sports TV show, Soccer AM and also presented Sky's live Football League coverage when they first obtained the rights in the 1996/97 season. In 1998, he was the announcer on ITV's Saturday night show Don't Try This at Home!. Then in 2001, he was the event commentator on the Channel 5 sports show Under Pressure which lasted one series and ten episodes. 

During ITV's broadcasting of Premier League football coverage from 2001 to 2004, Williams was part of the team, commentating on edited matches and goal highlights. He also presented ITV's snooker coverage (the Nations Cup and the Champions Cup) between 1999 and 2002.

Books
Russ Williams is author or co-author of the following books:

"Football Babylon", Virgin Books (1996)

"The Russ and Jono's Breakfast Experience" (with Jonathan Coleman), Virgin Books (1997)

"Football Babylon 2", Virgin Books (1998)

"How to Walk Yourself Healthy and Happy: Why Walking Exercise Boosts Physical and Mental Health", M-Y Books Ltd. (2020)

"How to Walk Yourself Healthy and Happy: Discover the Physical and Mental Benefits of Regular Walking" (audiobook), Zenibo Publishing (2020)

Personal life
Williams lives in Tewin, Hertfordshire. He is an ardent walker and a supporter of Tottenham Hotspur Football Club.

References

1962 births
Absolute Radio
People from Blackpool
English radio DJs
Living people